The 2013 FIVB Volleyball Men's U23 World Championship was held in Uberlândia, Brazil from 6 to 13 October 2013. This was the first edition of the tournament.

Twenty-one point rule
For this tournament, the first four sets were played over 21 points.

Qualification
The 2013 FIVB Volleyball Men's U23 World Championship will feature two countries per confederation plus the host Brazil and the highest country in the world rankings not already selected by their confederation, in this case Russia.

Pools composition
Teams were seeded following the Serpentine system according to their FIVB World Ranking as of 22 July 2013. FIVB reserved the right to seed the hosts as head of pool A regardless of the World Ranking. Rankings are shown in brackets except the hosts who ranked 1st.

Venue

Pool standing procedure
 Match points
 Number of matches won
 Sets ratio
 Points ratio
 Result of the last match between the tied teams

Match won 3–0 or 3–1: 3 match points for the winner, 0 match points for the loser
Match won 3–2: 2 match points for the winner, 1 match point for the loser

Preliminary round
All times are Brasília Time (UTC−03:00).

Pool A

 

|}

 
 

|}

Pool B

|}

  
      

       
 

|}

Final round
All times are Brasília Time (UTC−03:00).

5th–8th places

5th–8th semifinals

|}

7th place match

|}

5th place match

|}

Final four

Semifinals

|}

3rd place match

|}

Final

|}

Final standing

Awards

Most Valuable Player
  Ricardo Lucarelli Souza
Best Setter
  Dmitry Kovalev
Best Outside Spikers
  Uroš Kovačević
  Filip Stoilović

Best Middle Blockers
  Ventsislav Ragin
  Matheus Cunda
Best Opposite Spiker
  Aleksandar Atanasijević
Best Libero
  Guilherme Kachel

References

External links
Official website
Final Standing
Awards
Statistics

FIVB Volleyball Men's U23 World Championship
Fivb Mens U23 Volleyball
International volleyball competitions hosted by Brazil
Fivb Mens U23 Volleyball
FIVB Volleyball Men's U23 World Championship